Statistics of Primera División de México for the 1980–81 season.

Overview
It was contested by 20 teams, and UNAM won the championship.

Atletas Campesinos was promoted from Segunda División.

Unión de Curtidores was relegated to Segunda División.

Teams

Stadiums and locations

Group stage

Group 1

Group 2

Group 3

Group 4

Results

Relegation play-offs

Atlas won 2-3 on aggregate. Unión de Curtidores was relegated to Segunda División.

Final stage

Semifinal

Group 1

Group 2

Final

UNAM won 4-2 on aggregate.

References
Mexico - List of final tables (RSSSF)

Liga MX seasons
Mex
1980–81 in Mexican football